Dizaj-e Shur (also Romanized as Dīzaj-e Shūr; also known as Dīzaj) is a village in Ardalan Rural District, Mehraban District, Sarab County, East Azerbaijan Province, Iran. At the 2006 census, its population was 15, in 4 families.

References 

Populated places in Sarab County